Matthew Glass is the pseudonym of an Australian-born author and doctor who is living and working in Britain. He is the author of Ultimatum, an eco-thriller set in the years 2032 and 2033, End Game, a geopolitical thriller set in 2018, and Fishbowl, a social-networking thriller set in the early 21st century. End Game was rereleased with the name Trigger Point in March 2012. The social network in Fishbowl is clearly inspired by Facebook but works with AI-generated avatars that can be used by corporations for user-targeted selling. His novels are noted for their complex and hyper-realistic depiction of international relations, especially with regard to diplomacy and economics.

References

Bibliography
 Glass, Matthew, Ultimatum. 2009. Atlantic Monthly Press, New York..
 Glass, Matthew, End Game. 2010. Corvus..
 Glass, Matthew, Trigger Point. 2012. Atlantic Monthly Press, New York.

Living people
Year of birth missing (living people)